Timberlea is a suburb of Upper Hutt, located 3.5-6.5 km northeast from the city centre. It had a population of 1612 at the 2013 Census.

The suburb is located on a plateau of the Eastern Hutt Valley Hills, with most of the suburb being 115-135 metres above sea level. It can be accessed from SH2 by exiting at Norana Road. It is bordered by Maoribank at the lower, south-western end of Norana Road and Brown Owl by SH2 to the north.

While there are no shops in Timberlea, residents have access to the Caltex service station and small shopping centre in neighbouring Brown Owl. The main shops in Upper Hutt's city centre are only 3.5-6.5 km away, depending on where in Timberlea you are travelling from.

Subdivisions 
Timberlea is effectively split into three distinctive areas:

The main part of Timberlea (between Mount Marua Drive and the border with Maoribank by Garth Lane) was developed mainly between the late 1960s and the early 1980s.

The section of Timberlea between Mount Marua Drive and SH2 is a very modern and relatively upmarket subdivision, with most houses being built from 2007 to present.

The section above Mount Marua Drive is known as Mount Marua (from Marua Palms Grove eastwards). This area, having been developed from 2010 onwards, is one of Upper Hutt's most upmarket and exclusive areas, containing many large homes on large sections, with nearly every house having an uninterrupted view of either the Upper Hutt Valley or the Mangaroa Valley (or both), due to being situated at the top of the Eastern Hutt Valley Hills. Mount Marua Way, situated at the highest point of the subdivision (between 210 and 240 metres above sea level), is a private gated community that has a communal tennis court and small pond.

Demographics 
Timberlea is part of the Maoribank statistical area.

Parks 
Timberlea has three public parks:

Speargrass Park; Located off of Speargrass Grove and Blueberry Grove, it contains a small playground.

Gentian Reserve; Located off of Gentian Street, this forest-covered reserve contains a few walking trails on the slopes of the hill on its eastern side.

Timberlea Park; Accessed from Norana Road, this central Timberlea park contains a small playground, community hall and large lawn next to the bush-covered valley hills.

Public Transport 
Timberlea is serviced by the Te Marua commuter bus route (#112), operated by Metlink.

References

Suburbs of Upper Hutt